Spirits of the Dead, also known as Tales of Mystery and Imagination and Tales of Mystery, is a 1968 horror anthology film comprising three segments respectively directed by Roger Vadim, Louis Malle and Federico Fellini, based on stories by Edgar Allan Poe. A French-Italian international co-production, the film's French title is derived from a 1856 collection of Poe's short stories translated by French poet Charles Baudelaire; the English titles Spirits of the Dead and Tales of Mystery and Imagination are respectively taken from an 1827 poem by Poe and a 1902 British collection of his stories.

Vadim's segment, "Metzengerstein", tells the story of the debauched Countess Frédérique de Metzengerstein (Jane Fonda), who devotes herself to taming a wild horse that once belonged to her cousin, Baron Wilhelm Berlifitzing (Peter Fonda). Malle's entry, "William Wilson", follows Wilson (Alain Delon), who is hounded throughout his life of cruelty and deception by a doppelgänger, whom he challenges to a fatal duel. Fellini's short, "Toby Dammit", a loose adaptation of "Never Bet the Devil Your Head", deals with the title character (Terence Stamp), an alcoholic Shakespearean actor, whose trip to Rome to make a Spaghetti Western in exchange for a Ferrari is complicated by multiple encounters with the Devil, who appears as a little girl with a white ball.

Spirits of the Dead was released in the United States by American International Pictures in an English-language version featuring narration by Vincent Price.

Plot

"Metzengerstein"
At the age of 22, Countess Frédérique inherits the Metzengerstein estate and lives a life of promiscuity and debauchery. While in the forest, her leg is caught in a trap and she is freed by her cousin and neighbour Baron Wilhelm, whom she has never met because of a long-standing family feud. She becomes enamoured with Wilhelm, but he rejects her for her wicked ways. His rejection infuriates Frédérique and she sets his stables on fire. Wilhelm is killed attempting to save his prized horses.

One black horse somehow escapes and makes its way to the Metzengerstein castle. The horse is very wild and Frédérique takes it upon herself to tame it. She notices at one point that a damaged tapestry depicts a horse eerily similar to the one that she has just taken in. Becoming obsessed with it, she orders its repair. During a thunderstorm, Frédérique is carried off by the spooked horse into a fire caused by a lightning strike.

"William Wilson"
In the early 19th century when Northern Italy is under Austrian rule, an army officer named William Wilson rushes to confess to a priest (in a church of the "Città alta" of Bergamo) that he has committed murder. Wilson then relates the story of his cruel ways throughout his life. After playing cards all night against the courtesan Giuseppina, his doppelgänger, also named William Wilson, convinces people that Wilson has cheated. In a rage, the protagonist Wilson stabs the other to death with a dagger. After making his confession, Wilson commits suicide by jumping from the tower of "Palazzo della Ragione", but when seen his corpse is transfixed by the same dagger.

"Toby Dammit"
Former Shakespearean actor Toby Dammit is losing his acting career to alcoholism. He agrees to work on a film, to be shot in Rome, for which he will be given a brand new Ferrari as a bonus incentive. Dammit begins to have unexpected visions of a macabre girl with a white ball. While at a film award ceremony, he gets drunk and appears to be slowly losing his mind.  A stunning woman comforts him, saying she will always be at his side if he chooses. Dammit is forced to make a speech, then leaves and takes delivery of his promised Ferrari. He races around the city, where he sees what appear to be fake people in the streets. Lost outside of Rome, Dammit eventually crashes into a work zone and comes to a stop before the site of a collapsed bridge. Across the ravine, he sees a vision of the little girl with a ball (whom he has earlier identified, in a TV interview, as his idea of the Devil). He gets into his car and speeds toward the void. The Ferrari disappears, and we then see a view of roadway with a thick wire across it, dripping with blood, suggesting Dammit has been decapitated. The girl from his vision picks up his severed head and the sun rises.

Cast
Credits primarily adapted from Italian Gothic Horror Films, 1957–1969 and Midnight Movie Monographs: Spirits of the Dead (Histoires Extraordinaires).
"Metzengerstein"

Jane Fonda as Countess Frédérique de Metzengerstein
Peter Fonda as Baron Wilhelm Berlifitzing
Serge Marquand as Hugues
Philippe Lemaire as Philippe
Carla Marlier as Claude
Georges Douking as the Upholsterer
James Robertson Justice as a Marquis
Françoise Prévost as a Courtesan
Marie-Ange Aniès as a Courtesan
Uncredited:
Dennis Berry as a Courtier
Jackie Blanchot as a Courtier
Audoin de Bardot as the Page
Anny Duperey as a Courtesan
Andréas Voutsinas as a Courtier
Maurice Ronet as the Narrator 
Clement Biddle Wood as the Narrator 

Despite receiving prominent billing in both the film and advertising materials, most of Justice and Prévost's performances appear to have been cut from the final print of the film.
"William Wilson"

Alain Delon as William Wilson
Marco Stefanelli as Wilson as a boy
Brigitte Bardot as Guiseppina Ditterheim 
Katia Christine as the Blonde Girl
Renzo Palmer as the Priest
Umberto D'Orsi as Hans
Daniele Vargas as the University Professor
Uncredited:
Paolo Giusti as Wilson's Double
Massimo Ardù as Wilson's Double as a boy
Andrea Esterhazy as Officer at Casino
John Karlsen as Military School Instructor
Franco Arcalli as the Teacher who beats Wilson

"Toby Dammit"

Terence Stamp as Toby Dammit
Marina Yaru as The Devil
Salvo Randone as Father Spagna
Annie Tonietti as the TV Commentator
Monica Pardo as Miki, the Curly-Haired Actress
Uncredited:
Antoni Pietrosi as "La Signora"
Federico Boido as Toby's Double
Marisa Traversi as Marilù Traversi 
Ferdinand Guillaume as the Old Blind Actor
Fabrizo Angeli as Maurizio Manetti
Ernesto Colli as Ernestino Manetti
Aleardo Ward as First TV Interviewer
Paul Cooper as Second TV Interviewer
Milena Vukotic as Third TV Interviewer
Nella Gambini as Elizabeth
Andrea Fantasia as the Producer
Campanella as Lombardi, the Assistant Producer
Brigitte as the Old Blind Actor's Aide
Irina Maleeva as a Gypsy Fortune Teller
Giovanni Tarallo as an Old Paparazzo
Fides Stagni as Herself

Van Heflin appeared in a deleted scene in which he plays an actor in Trente dollari, the Spaghetti Western that Toby is cast in.

Production

Development
Omnibus films were popular in Europe in the 1960s so producers Alberto Grimaldi and Raymond Eger developed the idea of film anthology influenced by the work of Edgar Allan Poe.

Initial directors announced to work on the film included Luchino Visconti, Claude Chabrol, Joseph Losey and Orson Welles. Orson Welles would direct one segment based on both "Masque of the Red Death" and "The Cask of Amontillado". Welles withdrew in September 1967 and was replaced by Fellini. The script, written in English by Welles and Oja Kodar, is in the Filmmuseum München collection. The final directors involved eventually became Federico Fellini, Roger Vadim and Louis Malle.

Production
Roger Vadim's segment "Metzengerstein" was filmed just after Vadim had completed shooting on his previous movie Barbarella, which also starred Jane Fonda. Scriptwriter and novelist Terry Southern, who had worked on the screenplay for Barbarella, travelled to Rome with Vadim and according to Southern's biographer Lee Hill, it was during the making of this segment that Peter Fonda told Southern of his idea to make a 'modern Western' movie. Southern was enthusiastic about the idea and agreed to work on the project, which eventually became the renowned independent film Easy Rider. The segment was filmed in Roscoff, a small town in Brittany.

Louis Malle accepted the job of directing the segment "William Wilson" in order to raise money for his next film Murmur of the Heart. The financial process of raising money for Murmur took him three years after completing "William Wilson" and in the meantime he shot two documentaries about India. Malle stated that he did not consider his collaboration in Histoires Extraordinaires a very personal one and that he agreed to make some compromises with the producer, Raymond Eger, in order to make the film more attractive to mainstream spectators. Malle's original conception of the film was closer to Poe’s tale than the final result. The most important changes were: casting Brigitte Bardot in the role of Giuseppina with the purpose of adding some erotic touches to the film, the inclusion of the dissection scene, and a somewhat explicit use of violence in some scenes. Malle did not enjoy working with Delon. He wanted Florinda Bolkan for the female lead but the producers insisted on someone more well known, like Bardot. Bardot agreed to make the film; Malle thought she was miscast.

Federico Fellini directed the segment "Toby Dammit" which he wrote with Bernardino Zapponi. Zapponi had a love for gothic literature which can be seen in his short story collection Gobal (1967) where he attempted to re-shape the genre into a contemporary setting. Zapponi's stories caught Fellini's attention. Fellini was particularly interested in C'è una voce nella mia vita ('There is a voice in my life'), which was his first choice in adapting into a film for Spirits of the Dead. The producers were reluctant to have Zapponi's name on the film, so Fellini changed his mind and returned to Poe for inspiration. Fellini considered "The Scythe of Time" and "The Premature Burial", but eventually chose "Never Bet the Devil Your Head". Zapponi and Fellini only used the ending of the story in their adaptation of the material. The film has thematic similarities to three earlier Fellini films. The disintegrating protagonist and the hellish celebrity demimonde he inhabits are reminiscent of both La Dolce Vita and 8½, while the interweaving of dreams and hallucinations into the plotline and the use of highly artificial art direction to reflect inner states resemble similar techniques used in 8½ and Juliet of the Spirits. Fellini rejected Poe's version of the devil, a lame old gentleman with his hair parted in front like a girl’s, and cast a 22 year old Russian woman (Marina Yaru) to play the devil as a young girl. Lending a "pedophiliac slant" to Toby's character, Fellini explained that "a man with a black cape and a beard was the wrong kind of devil for a drugged, hipped actor. His devil must be his own immaturity, hence, a child."

Release
Spirits of the Dead opened in Paris in June 1968.
Spirits of the Dead was released in Italy on September 12, 1968 in Italy where the film was distributed by P.E.A. It grossed a total of 512 million Italian lira on its domestic release in Italy.

Samuel Z. Arkoff offered the producers $200,000 for American International Pictures to have the US and Canadian rights, but was knocked back as Arkoff wanted to cut a scene from the Fellini sequence. A year later the producers had not been able to find another buyer so when Arkoff made the same offer they took it. The film was released in the United States on July 23, 1969.

Critical reception

The film received a mixed critical reception, with the Fellini segment widely regarded as the best of the three. Reviewing the picture under its English language title Spirits of the Dead, Vincent Canby of The New York Times wrote that "Toby Dammit, the first new Fellini to be seen here since Juliet of the Spirits in 1965, is marvellous: a short movie but a major one. The Vadim is as over decorated and shrill as a drag ball, but still quite fun, and the Malle, based on one of Poe's best stories, is simply tedious." Review aggregator Rotten Tomatoes reports that 86% of 21 critic reviews are positive for the film; the website's consensus reads, "Three auteurs descend on the works of Poe, each putting on a ghoulish show -- adapting The Tomahawk Man's tales of dreams and fright, with Fellini's segment particularly out of sight."

References

Notes

Citations

Sources

External links

 
Spirits of the Dead at TCMDB

1968 films
1968 horror films
American International Pictures films
French horror anthology films
Italian horror anthology films
Films scored by Nino Rota
Films about automobiles
Films about filmmaking
Films about horses
Films about suicide
Films based on works by Edgar Allan Poe
Films directed by Federico Fellini
Films directed by Louis Malle
Films directed by Roger Vadim
Films set in Italy
Films set in Rome
Films set in the Holy Roman Empire
Films set in the 15th century
Films set in the 19th century
Films shot in Spain
1960s French-language films
English-language French films
English-language Italian films
1960s English-language films
Films about gambling
1960s ghost films
Films with screenplays by Federico Fellini
Films produced by Alberto Grimaldi
French ghost films
Italian ghost films
1960s Italian films
1960s French films